Central Daylight Time (CDT) may refer to

 Australia Central Daylight Time, UTC+11
 Central European Summer Time, UTC+2
 Central Time Zone (North America), UTC−5